Ganawuri is a town in Riyom Local Government Area of Plateau State in the Middle Belt region of Nigeria. The postal code for the area is 931.

People and language
The indigenous people of the town are the Niten people who speak Iten, a Beromic language.

Notable people
 Damishi Sango

See also
 List of villages in Plateau State

References

Populated places in Plateau State